Northeast Philadelphia Airport  is a public airport just north of the intersection of Grant Avenue and Ashton Road in Northeast Philadelphia. It is part of the Philadelphia Airport System along with Philadelphia International Airport and is the general aviation reliever airport for Philadelphia International. Northeast Philadelphia Airport is the sixth busiest airport in Pennsylvania. Two fixed-base operators provide fuel, major aircraft repair, hangar rental, aircraft rental and charter, flight instruction, and aircraft sales.

Location
(The airport does not extend all the way to these boundaries.) Development includes  a Pepsi-Cola bottling plant, an industrial park with aviation-related businesses, the headquarters of the 1st and 8th Districts of the Philadelphia Police Department, and the former site of the Internal Revenue Service Philadelphia Service Center. A TJ Maxx distribution center and an ice skating rink opened in 2001 on land leased from the airport.

When this airport opened the surrounding area was largely open farmland. Residential neighborhoods and businesses have developed close to the airport, so pilots must observe noise abatement procedures.

History
Northeast Philadelphia Airport started in the 1930s as the Northeast Airport, a grass field with no paved runways, one of three small airports in the area. Just across Roosevelt Boulevard to the west, next to Red Lion Road, was Boulevard Airport, the most important of the three. Further west was Budd Field (built for  Edward G. Budd Manufacturing Company, later as a golf course and other parts for housing) and Somerton Airport (near Bustleton Avenue and Red Lion Road), no longer in existence, close enough that pilots had to take care not to infringe on adjacent traffic patterns. The site of the Boulevard Airport is now a shopping mall (Red Lion Plaza) and housing. The Northeast Airport became today's large airport.

The United States Army Air Corps began construction of a  airbase in Northeast Philadelphia during World War II, but the project was never completed and the property was turned over to the city in 1944. After the city finished the work, Philadelphia Northeast Airport opened in June 1945. In 1948 the name was changed to North Philadelphia Airport.

The airport expanded in 1960 when Runway 6/24 was extended to its present length. Runway 10/28 was abandoned at this time due to construction on the western end of the runway. The name was changed again in 1980, to the present Northeast Philadelphia Airport.

The airport was the headquarters and maintenance facility for Ransome Airlines, which operated scheduled passenger flights as Allegheny Commuter to Washington D.C. via Reagan National Airport (DCA) and to nearby Philadelphia International Airport (PHL) as well as to other regional destinations beginning in September 1973 as a feeder for Allegheny Airlines. Ransome's passenger operation from PNE was ended by the PATCO strike of 1981 which cut regional airline schedules by 25 percent; the airline operated independently for some time, fed Delta Air Lines flights in the early 1980s, and was later sold to Pan American World Airways and then to Trans World Airlines, ending its life as Trans World Express. PNE continued to be a maintenance base for TWE through the early 1990s. The base shut down in 1995, with a loss of 300 local jobs.

Cargo

Facilities and aircraft 
It has two asphalt runways: 6/24 is 7,000 by 150 feet (2,134 x 46 m) and 15/33 is 5,000 by 150 feet (1,524 x 46 m).

In the year ending September 6, 2018, the airport had 37,933 aircraft operations, average 104 per day: 92% general aviation, 8% air taxi and <1% military. 132 aircraft were then based at the airport: 59% single-engine, 23% multi-engine, 13% jet and 5% helicopter.

Tenants

 AgustaWestland Philadelphia Corporation

Incidents and accidents
On April 4, 1991, a Sunbell Aviation Helicopters Bell 412 collided Mid-Air with a Piper Aerostar which was flying from Williamsport to Northeast Philadelphia Airport. The Piper was carrying United States Senator of Pennsylvania H. John Heinz III when it collided over Merion Elementary School in Lower Merion Township, Pennsylvania. All aboard both aircraft, as well as two children at the school, were killed. The helicopter had been dispatched to investigate a problem with the landing gear of Heinz's plane. While moving in for a closer look, the helicopter collided with the plane, causing both aircraft to lose control and crash. The subsequent NTSB investigation attributed the cause of the crash to poor judgment by the pilots of the two aircraft involved.

References

External links

Pennsylvania Bureau of Aviation: Northeast Philadelphia Airport
 
 

Airports in Pennsylvania
Transportation buildings and structures in Philadelphia
Northeast Philadelphia